Isles-sur-Suippe (literally Isles on Suippe) is a commune in the Marne department in north-eastern France.

Geography
The commune is traversed by the Suippe river.

History
Isles-sur-Suippe, Insula super Suppia at the early 11th century, is a village located between two branches of the Suippe, on the road from  Reims to Rethel.

The relay station 

The royal relay station of Ysle was founded mid-17th century, the postal road from Paris to Sedan, started in 1654, had a mandatory halt there; located between the halts of Reims and Rethel-Mazarin, it was an important link of the road to Sedan, a then predominant town of the Ardennes.
At that time, the Galand family settled in Ysle and initiated a postmaster dynasty.

Late modern and contemporary
During his 18th official trip, General Charles de Gaulle, president of the Republic of France, halts in Isles-sur-Suippe on 22 April 1963. He was welcomed by préfet Jean-Émile Vié, by mayor Charles Dolhem, by gendarmes, by the fire department and the entire population. He was offered a bunch of flowers by a schoolgirl.

See also
Communes of the Marne department

References

Islessursuippe